Zaviar Gooden (born August 31, 1990) is a former American football linebacker. He was drafted by the Tennessee Titans in the third round of the 2013 NFL Draft. He played college football at Missouri.

Early years
Gooden was born in Austin, Texas.  He attended Pflugerville High School, and played for he Pflugerville Panthers high school football team.  During high school, he played as both a safety and running back.  Rivals.com rated Gooden as the 32nd best high school linebacker prospect his age, and the 56th best all round prospect in Texas. He graduated from high school with a 3.9 grade point average (GPA).  Gooden received athletic scholarship offers from Oklahoma State, Purdue and Stanford, but chose to attend the University of Missouri.

He also spent four years on the track & field team in high school, competing in the 200-meter, long jump (20 ft 5 in), 4 × 100 m relay (42.98) and 4 × 400 m relay (3:21.17).

College career
Gooden enrolled in the University of Missouri, where he played for coach Gary Pinkel's Missouri Tigers football team from 2009 to 2012.  Before the start of his freshman season, Gooden made the transition from safety to linebacker. During his first season he was used as backup to the starting linebackers, but played in 13 games, making 30 tackles and forcing one fumble.

It was his sophomore season that Gooden became a starter and immediately made a big impact. From the 13 games, he led the team in defense, making 84 tackles and three sacks, breaking up five passes and making two interceptions.
He kept up his momentum in his junior season, with 80 tackles, one sack, two interceptions and four broken up passes in his 13 games.

His senior season was broken up by a hamstring injury and he played only 10 games, from which he made 61 tackles and a single interception, which was returned for a touchdown versus Southeastern Louisiana Lions.

Professional career

2013 NFL Draft
Gooden posted good numbers at the NFL Scouting Combine, and during Pro Day he beat all linebackers in every regard except vertical jump.

Tennessee Titans
The Tennessee Titans drafted Gooden in the third round with the 97th overall pick of the 2013 NFL Draft.

On September 5, 2015, Gooden was placed on injured reserve with a hamstring injury, but was waived the following week.

Detroit Lions
On May 2, 2016, the Detroit Lions signed Gooden to a one-year contract. On September 3, 2016, he was waived by the Lions. He was signed to the practice squad on September 21, 2016. He was promoted to the active roster on September 24. He was released on September 26 and was re-signed to the practice squad the next day. He was released on October 13, 2016.

Arizona Cardinals
On November 1, 2016, Gooden was signed to the Arizona Cardinals' practice squad. He was promoted to the active roster on November 18, 2016.

On September 2, 2017, Gooden was released by the Cardinals.

References

External links
Missouri Tigers bio

1990 births
Living people
American football linebackers
Detroit Lions players
Missouri Tigers football players
Players of American football from Austin, Texas
Tennessee Titans players
Arizona Cardinals players